Pioneer is the second studio album by American country music group The Band Perry. It was released on April 2, 2013, via Republic Records. A deluxe edition with four bonus tracks and a special red album cover with an autograph from each band member was made available at Target stores the same day. The Band Perry co-wrote nine of the album's twelve tracks. The album has produced four singles: "Better Dig Two", "Done", "Don't Let Me Be Lonely" and "Chainsaw". As of October 2015, the album has sold 619,000 copies in the United States.

Critical reception

Pioneer received generally favorable reviews from critics. On the review aggregator site Metacritic, the album currently holds a score of 72, indicating "generally favorable reviews", based on 7 reviews. AllMusic music critic Stephen Thomas Erlewine told that the album has "a swagger that underpins" it, which "retains a sense of palpable defiance even in the quietest moments", but in doing so with "her vigor lending passion to music that is deliberately designed to appeal to the widest possible audience as it blurs the line between contemporary country and pop". which causes "some seriously odd juxtapositions". In addition, Erlewine found that "as good as the by-the-books ballads and rocking country are, the moments when the façade slips a bit make this worth hearing as an album and not a collection of singles." At Entertainment Weekly, Melissa Maerz evoked how "it's fun to hear her get those linens dirty" on this album. Rob Burkhardt of Music Is My Oxygen said the album built "on the foundation laid by the first album and taking things to the next level."

At Country Weekly, Jon Freeman called it clearly "time well spent" on making the album, which leads the band in furthering their "stadium-sized ambitions", and they said that the album is just below "outstanding" with an A−. In addition, Freeman said that Pioneers "overall spirit of adventure is summed up in the gorgeous" track entitled "Pioneer", which that is because it starts off "sweet and delicate," and the song "offers a message of encouragement to be bold in the face of uncertainty and doubt as it builds to a thrilling crescendo." Taste of Country's Billy Dukes evoked how the album "is just as dramatic, yet dramatically more steady than their debut effort" that "holds no shortage of styles and surprises, even a lilting folk song in the title track." Dukes noted that "for some, this will be the highlight of the project — one can be sure very few people will agree on a favorite", and the album has "ambitious" lyrics that "shows a maturity largely unmatched by a group only two albums into a blossoming career." Dukes stated that the band had some sporadically "bold choices", which are "rough around the edges," at the same time "the collection is more than strong enough to justify a headlining tour". David Burger of The Salt Lake Tribune said that The Band Perry "show a confidence unusual for a group so young". At Rolling Stone, Will Hermes found this album to contain "goth-iness", which is because the siblings "are remarkably death-obsessed", and called this release a "perky, rocked-up country-pop set."

At The Oakland Press, Gary Graff exclaimed "Step aside, Taylor, and put the kerosene down, Miranda — Kimberly Perry is about to become country music’s new man-slaying warrior for women done wrong" on the band's second offering.  However, Graff said that this "youthful group is still occasionally wanting in the lyric department, but 'Pioneer' mostly shows that the path the trio blazed with its debut was no mere fluke." Roughstock's Matt Bjorke alluded to how "Pioneer doesn't sound like anything else in Country Music and that...should be...enough to help keep the family band around for more than a few more years to come." Furthermore, Bjorke contended that "we might be witnessing the next country/pop crossover to superstardom a la Taylor Swift" because they "could very well be...a Pop band if they didn't love mandolins, banjos, fiddles and steel guitars as much as they do (must be that East Tennessee upbringing)." At the USA Today, Jerry Shriver stated this "robust effort from the sibling trio centers on obsessive love, and Kimberly Perry sounds unhinged and revenge-thirsty", yet the album has "moments of vulnerability, then it's back to feeling all apocalyptic. Strong songs, potent production. But dang, girl."

Track listing

Personnel
Adapted from Pioneer liner notes.

The Band Perry
 Kimberly Perry – lead vocals
 Neil Perry – bouzouki, mandolin, background vocals
 Reid Perry – bass guitar, background vocals

Additional musicians
 J.T. Corenflos – electric guitar
 Eric Darken – percussion
 Dan Dugmore – steel guitar, dobro
 Stuart Duncan – fiddle
 Paul Franklin – steel guitar, sitar
 Jim Hoke – penny whistle
 Dann Huff – 12-string electric guitar, electric guitar
 David Huff – percussion, programming
 Charlie Judge – Hammond B-3 organ, keyboards, loop programming, piano, synthesizer
 Jerry McPherson – electric guitar
 Cherie Oakley – background vocals
 Aaron Sterling – drums
 Ilya Toshinsky – banjo, acoustic guitar, resonator guitar

Charts

Weekly charts

Singles

Year-end charts

Certifications

References

2013 albums
The Band Perry albums
Republic Records albums
Albums produced by Dann Huff